Chart Throb is a 2006 novel by Ben Elton. It was released in hardback on 6 November 2006 in the UK, and 9 January 2007 in the US. It is a satire of The X Factor/Pop Idol-style reality TV programmes.

Plot summary
The story revolves around the occurrences during the latest series of the hit 'reality' star search programme, Chart Throb. The show was the brainchild of Calvin Simms, who assumed a Simon Cowell style role as the mean, English judge. He is accompanied by the extravagant but bitchy former rockstar-turned-transsexual reality TV star, Beryl Blenheim, and the ageing pop manager Rodney Root. Calvin's wife wants to divorce him, but as part of a bet she agrees that if he can rig the results of the new series of Chart Throb, she will leave him without taking any of his cash. Beryl Blenheim is trying to manage the scripted reality show she helms, The Blenheims, whilst coping with her drug-addled wife, Serenity, and the flagging pop career of one of her daughters, Priscilla. Meanwhile, Rodney is facing the challenge of judging his old flame, the beautiful Iona, whilst trying to revive some public interest in his life and work. All of these stories clash and reach a climax at the final of the TV series. At the end of the book, it is said that by the year 2050 everybody will be either a pop star or star of their own reality TV programme.

Chart Throb was the 11th novel by Ben Elton, and was released both in hardback and paperback.

Reception
James Watson of The Telegraph said Chart Throb would change readers' opinions of The X Factor while Bill Greenwell of The Independent said Elton's humor was hit and miss

References

2006 British novels
British comedy novels
British satirical novels
Novels by Ben Elton
Bantam Books books